Austroaeschna obscura is a large species of dragonfly in the family Telephlebiidae, 
known as the Sydney mountain darner. 
It is found in the Sydney Basin in Australia, where it inhabits rivers and streams.

Austroaeschna obscura is a very dark dragonfly with distinct pale markings. It appears similar to the more widespread multi-spotted darner, Austroaeschna multipunctata.

Gallery

See also
 List of dragonflies of Australia

References

Telephlebiidae
Odonata of Australia
Endemic fauna of Australia
Taxa named by Günther Theischinger
Insects described in 1982